This is a list of documentary films about agriculture. A documentary film is a nonfictional motion picture intended to document some aspect of reality, primarily for the purposes of instruction or maintaining a historical record. Agriculture is the cultivation of animals, plants, fungi, and other life forms for food, fiber, biofuel, medicinals and other products used to sustain and enhance human life.

Documentary films about agriculture

Bangaarada Manushya
All in This Tea
Bananas!*
Bananas Unpeeled
The Biggest Little Farm
A Cow at My Table
The Dark Side of Chocolate
Democratic Allsorts
Dirt! The Movie
Everyday Life in a Syrian Village
Farmland
The Farmer's Wife
Food, Inc.
Fresh
The Fruit Hunters
The Future of Food
The Garden
God's Country
The Grain That Built a Hemisphere
The Great Resistance
H-2 Worker
Harvest (1967)
The Harvest (2010)
The Harvest Shall Come
Henry Browne, Farmer
Het is een schone dag geweest
In Grave Danger of Falling Food
Keep the Hives Alive
King Corn
Let It Be
Life at the End of the Rainbow
The Moo Man
More Than Honey
Mugabe and the White African
Old Partner
Olives and Their Oil
Our Daily Bread
Paper Wheat
Peaceable Kingdom
Pig Business
A Place in the Land
The Plow That Broke the Plains
The Real Dirt on Farmer John
The River
Standing Silent Nation
Strawberry Fields
Sweetgrass
The Tale of the Wonderful Potato
That Should Not Be: Our Children Will Accuse Us
Touchstone: Dancing With Angels
Troublesome Creek: A Midwestern
We Feed the World
The World According to Monsanto
World of Plenty

See also

 List of documentary films
 List of films about food and drink
 Lists of films
 Outline of film

References

Agriculture-related lists

Agriculture